Préaux is a commune in the Mayenne department in north-western France.

Geography
The Vaige flows southeastwards through the middle of the commune and forms part of its eastern border.

See also
Communes of Mayenne

References

Communes of Mayenne